The Mermaid Inn is a historical inn located in Rye, East Sussex.

The Mermaid Inn may also refer to:

Mermaid Tavern, London
An historic building in Welshpool, Wales

See also
 Mermaid House Hotel
 Mytton and Mermaid Hotel